Bradford High School is a public high school in Bradford, Ohio.  It is the only high school in the Bradford Exempted Village Schools district.

Bradford's fight song is sung to the march, "Our Director."

OHSAA (Ohio High School Athletic Association) State Championships
 2021 Girls Softball

See also
 N.M.A.M. Institute of Technology

References

External links
 District Website

High schools in Darke County, Ohio
Public high schools in Ohio